Albert C. Hunt was the inventor of the wigwag, a grade crossing signal used in transportation. Hunt was a mechanical engineer from Southern California. He invented the wigwag in the early 1900s out of the necessity for a safer railroad grade crossing. Hunt was associated with the Pacific Electric interurban streetcar railroad.

References

20th-century American inventors
American people in rail transportation
Year of birth missing
Year of death missing
American mechanical engineers